No Letting Go is a 2015 American drama film directed by Jonathan D. Bucari.  It is Bucari's directorial debut and is based on his 2013 short film Illness.  It is also based on the true story of the producer and co-screenwriter Randi Silverman.

Plot
A young teenager struggles with a debilitating mental illness as his mom risks everything to save him without losing the rest of her family.

Cast
Cheryl Allison as Catherine
Richard Burgi as Henry
David Schallipp as Timothy (10 yrs)
Noah Silverman as Timothy (14 yrs)
Seamus Davey-Fitzpatrick as Kyle (14 yrs)
Jan Uczkowski as Kyle (17 yrs)
Julian Murdoch as Jessie (10 yrs)
Jack McCarthy as Jessie (6 yrs)
Lee Bryant as Emily
Janet Hubert as Dr. Stacey Slater
Lisa Roberts Gillan as Dr. Maynard
Tony Gillan as Principal Collins
Neal Huff as James
Gabriel Rush as Frank
Wyatt Ralff as Charlie (10 yrs)
Charlie Kilgore as Charlie (14 yrs)
Alysia Reiner as Lisa
Kathy Najimy as Dr. Nancy Harris
Noah Fleiss as Sasha
Jared Gilman as Wes

References

External links
 
 

2015 films
American drama films
American films based on actual events
Features based on short films
2015 directorial debut films
2015 drama films
2010s English-language films
2010s American films